My Name is Niki is a 1952 West German comedy film directed by Rudolf Jugert and starring Paul Hörbiger, Aglaja Schmid and Hardy Krüger. It was made by Bavaria Film at the company's Munich Studios and on location in the city and in Hamburg. The film's sets were designed by the art directors Franz Bi and Botho Höfer.

Cast
 Paul Hörbiger as Hieronymus Spitz
 Aglaja Schmid as Winnie
 Hardy Krüger as Paul
 Erika von Thellmann as Jette
 Lina Carstens as Frau Altmann
 Heini Göbel as Stangl
 Bruno Hübner as Regierungsdirektor
 Hans Pössenbacher as Bahnhofsvorstand
 Charles Regnier as Redakteur Claus
 Hedwig Wangel as Guste
 Carsta Löck as Junge Magd
 Harry Hertzsch as Kommissar
 Ewald Wenck as Schaffner
 Claus Hollmann as Niki

References

Bibliography 
 James Robert Parish. Film Actors Guide. Scarecrow Press, 1977.

External links 
 

1952 films
1952 comedy films
German comedy films
West German films
1950s German-language films
Films directed by Rudolf Jugert
Bavaria Film films
German black-and-white films
1950s German films
Films shot at Bavaria Studios
Films shot in Hamburg
Films shot in Munich